is the 2000 Japanese horror prequel of Ring directed by Norio Tsuruta. The film is based on a screenplay by Hiroshi Takahashi which in turn is based on the short story "Lemon Heart" from the Birthday anthology by Koji Suzuki. Ring 0: Birthday was nominated for the 2001 edition of Fantasporto, but lost to Amores perros.

Plot
In the present, a girl calls her friend to tell her about how she watched the cursed videotape. She recounts about how she experienced a nightmare, where she witnessed Sadako being murdered by Dr. Ikuma.

Thirty years prior, Akiko Miyaji, the fiancé of a fellow reporter who was killed during Shizuko's infamous ESP demonstration, interviews Shizuko's daughter, Sadako's former elementary school teacher Sudo about Sadako's nensha powers. Sudo recounts how Sadako was withdrawn as a child and predicted her classmates drowning in the ocean during a field trip. Meanwhile, 19-year-old Sadako joins an acting troupe as an understudy. Her natural charisma infuriates lead actor, Aiko Hazuki, whose relationship with the troupe director, Yusaku Shigemori, sours due to the latter's newfound favor for Sadako. Aiko is later found murdered by a figure in white so Sadako takes her place. Sadako and troupe sound director, Hiroshi Toyama, are attracted to each other, much to the disappointment of Toyama's girlfriend, costume designer Etsuko Tachihara. While praised by Shigemori and Toyama, the other troupe members grow to distrust and fear Sadako, as they suspect that she is the one who caused Aiko's death and other supernatural occurrences, including an apparition of a girl in white with long hair similar to Sadako.

Akiko is told by Sudo that Shizuko descended to madness before her suicide ever since moving to live with Dr. Heihachiro Ikuma, and that Sudo heard strange childlike noises in the attic. Etsuko, wanting to discover Sadako's origins, contacts Sadako's psychiatrist, but he refuses to answer and throws away Sadako's résumé; the résumé is taken by Akiko's assistant, allowing him and Akiko to locate Sadako in the troupe. When they start to photograph her, she telekinetically breaks the camera; the two discover that all the photographs contain ghostly faces and a girl with long hair, confirming Akiko's suspicion of the existence of "two" Sadakos. Shigemori, obsessed with Sadako, says he will kill her if she tries to kill him. Toyama interrupts and Shigemori is killed through a cut that also wounds Toyama. Sadako heals him just by touching him and later is able to make a disabled man regain his ability to walk. The two confess their love and promise to leave the troupe and live together after finishing their last play.

The play is a disaster as Sadako, influenced by recordings of her mother's demonstration played by Etsuko, sees visions of her mother during the demonstration and kills her psychiatrist. The troupe members beat her to death. They visit Ikuma, who tells them that Sadako split into two beings resembling each of her parents; the malevolent one who resembled her unknown father is kept from growing by Ikuma in the attic. Before they can kill it, both Sadakos merge with each other and escape with Toyama. In her merged form, Sadako kills all the troupe members, including Toyama. Akiko and Etsuko hide in Ikuma's house. Rather than face Sadako's wrath, Akiko shoots Etsuko and herself.

Sadako is found by Ikuma, recovered and tearfully mourning her own actions. Ikuma drugs her and chases her outside to the well. Despite her pleas, he brains her with an axe and throws her down the well before breaking down in tears. Sadako has a dream of meeting Toyama again and screams as the well stone is slid in place, trapping her inside.

Cast

Production
In 1999, Koji Suzuki was finishing his written sources for the Ring series by including a fourth titled Birthday which collects three short stories that filled in details of the story. Asmik Ace decided to hire Ring and Ring 2 screenwriter Hiroshi Takahashi to adapt the story Lemonheart from Birthday. Birthday captured the life of the character of Sadako just before she consigned to her fate seen in the later Ring series. Producer Takasige Ichise offered Hideo Nakata the chance to direct, who passed on the offer.

The director for the film was Norio Tsuruta. Tsuruta had previously worked on direct-to-video horror scripts such as Honto ni atta kowai hanashi (Scary True Stories) in 1991, and wrote and directed the sequel. After working on various television and direct-to-video works, Tsuruta got to work with screenwriter Hiroshi Takahashi on the segment "The Curse" on the television special Haunted School F. Takahashi lobbied for Tsuruta to take on the film. Tsuruta referred to the film as "a tragedy" with a theme about "a young woman who is oppressed  because she is different from everyone else. In Japan, there is great pressure not to stray too far from the norm".

Yukie Nakama was cast in the role of Sadako. After Nakama's friends had seen Ring, they teased her about her resemblance to Sadako. Nakama was later contacted by her agent who mentioned they were looking for actresses for the role of Sadako and tried out for the role. She received confirmation of her role in the next two weeks.

Release
Ring 0: Birthday was released in Japan on January 22, 2000 where it was distributed by Toho. It was released on a double bill with the film Isola. In the Philippines, the film was theatrically released as Ring-0: The Birthday on May 21, 2003. The film was released direct-to-video in the United States under the title Ringu 0 on August 23, 2005 by DreamWorks/Universal Home Video.

Reception
Online film database AllMovie gave the film two stars out of five, referring to it as a "mediocre Carrie rip" and that it "can only be truly reviled as a desecration of the original Ringu's uniquely persuasive and subtle horror". The review noted that the "film's effort to explain exactly who Sadako (Yukie Nakama) is and how she became a powerful evil force, the film heaps contrivance upon contrivance, mixing clichés from backstage melodramas with those from Carrie and all its imitators, and leaving the viewer with little beyond the strength of Nakama's appealing performance and a few mild scares to hang on to".

See also
 List of horror films of 2000
 List of Japanese films of 2000

References

Works cited

External links
 
 

2000 films
2000 horror films
2000s Japanese-language films
2000s ghost films
Japanese horror films
Films about bullying
Films about telekinesis
Films based on short fiction
Films directed by Norio Tsuruta
Films set in 1968
Japanese films about revenge
Japanese ghost films
The Ring (franchise)
Toho films
2000s Japanese films